Lifen Zhang (born in 1962) is a Chinese journalist, author and broadcaster.

Biography 

Born in Shanghai, China, Lifen received his BA degree in
Journalism (1984) at Fudan University, Shanghai, where he had also taught
for a few years. He came to Britain to pursue postgraduate studies in 1988
on winning the Sino-British Friendship Scholarship; then obtained his PhD in
Mass Communications (1994) at University of Leicester, England. His first
book, Wondering by the End of Century (co-authored) was published in 1988.

Upon completing his doctorate, Lifen worked for 10 years at the BBC as
assistant producer for TV, producer, senior producer, presenter,
news/current affairs editor and senior journalism-production trainer for
the BBC World Service.

Lifen Zhang is associate editor, Financial Times, and founding editor for
FTChinese.com, FT's Chinese language website. He is also founding editor and editor-in-chief for FTRui (FT's Chinese-language lifestyle and wealth management magazine).
 
Lifen was a visiting scholar at Department of Journalism, the National
Chengchi University, Taipei, in 2003. He is also member of the
International Advisory Committee for Department of Journalism, Hong Kong
Baptist University.

In early 2010, Lifen is visiting professor at Dept of Journalism, Hong Kong Baptist University. 
 
He sits on the Executive Committee of the Great Britain-China Centre (GBCC)
based in London.

Also, he is on the advisory board of OMFIF where he is regularly involved in meetings regarding the financial and monetary system.

Awards 
He has received various journalism awards including a National Reportage
Prize in China in 1988 and the BBC Onassis Travel Award in 2001.

References

1962 births
Living people
Chinese journalists
Writers from Shanghai